Ilorin or Illorin usually refers to the capital city of the Nigerian state of Kwara.

It may also refer to:

 Ilorin Emirate, a traditional state
 Ilorin West, East, and South, local government areas of Ilorin city.
 University of Ilorin
 Ilorin International Airport
 Diocese of Ilorin